The men's 1 km time trial at the 1954 British Empire and Commonwealth Games, was part of the cycling programme, which took place in July 1954.

There was a tie for the gold medal between Dick Ploog and Alfred Swift so no silver was awarded.

Results

References

Men's 1km time trial
Cycling at the Commonwealth Games – Men's 1 km time trial